Burning Plain may refer to:

 The Burning Plain, a 2008 drama film
 Burning Plains, a fictional place in The Inheritance Cycle